Mormino is a surname. Notable people with the surname include:

Gary R. Mormino, American historian and author
Drew Mormino (born 1983), American football player